Acromantis siporana, common name Mentawai mantis, is a species of praying mantis found in Sumatra and on the Mentawai Islands.

See also
List of mantis genera and species

References

Siporana
Mantodea of Southeast Asia
Insects of Indonesia
Fauna of Sumatra
Insects described in 1915